Gaetano Azzariti (Naples, 23 March 1881 – Rome, 5 January 1961) was an Italian jurist and politician, who headed the Commission on Race under the Fascist regime, and served as Minister of Justice of the Badoglio I Cabinet after the fall of the regime. After the war, from 1957 to 1961, he was president of the Constitutional Court of Italy.

Biography

He was born in Naples into a family of Apulian origins; both his father and two of his brothers (including Francesco Saverio Azzariti, senator of the Kingdom of Italy) were magistrates. He graduated in law from the University of Naples in 1901. A member of the so-called "Neapolitan school" of jurisprudence, he was close to Lodovico Mortara and Vittorio Scialoja. In 1906, at age twenty-five, he became secretary of the commission for the examination of codes for the Eritrean colony. In 1908 he was a member of the commission for the reform of the codes, set up by Vittorio Emanuele Orlando, and in 1909 he became private secretary of the Minister of Grace and Justice Vittorio Scialoja; in 1918, after the First World War, he was appointed secretary of the Postwar Commission.

Much of his work was carried out at the Legislative Office of the Ministry of Grace and Justice, for which he was responsible almost without interruption from 1927 until 1949, except for the period between 25 July 1943 and 4 June 1944. Within this ministry he rose in rank, becoming councilor of the Court of Appeal in 1923, councilor of the Court of Cassation in 1928, and section president of the Court of Appeal in 1931. He played an important role in the drafting of the texts of the civil code and the civil procedure code of 1942, of the bankruptcy law of 1942 and of the law on the judicial system of 1940. In addition to coordinating the related preparatory work, he was part of some of the commissions in charge of the material drafting of the norms and drafting parts of the accompanying ministerial reports. In 1924 he was also appointed first instance judge for the criminal cases of the Republic of San Marino. 

A convinced anti-Semite, in a speech of 28 March 1942 he stated that "the dominant egalitarianism (...) regardless of age, sex, religion or race", is no longer "a kind of indisputable dogma": with fascism "it is now shelved in the attic", and that "racial diversity is an insuperable obstacle to the establishment of personal relationships, from which biological or psychic alterations to the purity of our people may arise". In 1938 he adhered to the Manifesto of Race, which played a significant role in the promulgation of the Italian racial laws, and became president of a Commission, the so-called "Tribunal for the Race", established at the Directorate General for Demography and Race of the Ministry of the Interior. The commission could declare "non-belonging to the Jewish race even in discrepancy with the results of the civil status documents" and accepted 104 of the 143 requests submitted in this regard. Azzariti would later claim that he had merely "turned into law the wishes of Mussolini" and that as president of the Tribunal for the Race he had "softened" the implementation of the racial laws.

On 25 July 1943, following the fall of the Fascist regime, he was appointed Minister of Justice in the first Badoglio cabinet. When the government fled to Brindisi after the armistice of Cassibile, Azzariti remained in Rome, where he found shelter in a convent during the German occupation. After the liberation of Rome, in June 1944, he resumed service at the legislative office of the Ministry of Grace and Justice; on 22 December 1944 the Italian Social Republic ordered his retirement, which had no effect as he was in Allied-controlled territory.

From June 1945 to July 1946 he collaborated with the Minister of Justice Palmiro Togliatti, after which he was a member of the two commissions for the reorganization of the state and for the reform of the administration (Commissioni Forti), within the ministry for the Constituent Assembly. He was later appointed president of the Higher Court for Public Waters, until he was retired for having reached the age limit in 1951. On 3 December 1955 he was appointed constitutional judge by the President of the Republic Giovanni Gronchi. He was the rapporteur of the sentence which affirmed the competence of the Court to judge the constitutional legitimacy of the rules that came into force before the Republican Constitution, and on 6 April 1957 he became President of the Court on until 5 January 1961, the day of his death.

In 1970 his native Naples dedicated a street to him, but in May 2015 the city council unanimously approved a motion to re-name the street after Luciana Pacifici, a Jewish child from Naples who was murdered in the Holocaust, becoming Naples' youngest victim of the Shoah. In March 2019 the Municipality of Naples decided the removal of the plaque affixed to the facade of the building where Azzariti had been born.

Honour 
 : Knight Grand Cross of the Order of Merit of the Italian Republic (2 june 1953)

References

1881 births
1961 deaths
Government ministers of Italy
Italian Ministers of Justice
Italian judges
Recipients of the Order of Merit of the Italian Republic
Presidents of the Constitutional Court of Italy
20th-century Italian jurists
Knights Grand Cross of the Order of Merit of the Italian Republic

it:Gaetano Azzariti
de:Gaetano Azzariti